Cameron Clark (born 24 October 2000) is a Scottish professional footballer who plays as a defender for Stirling Albion.

Club career

Youth career
Clark started his career in the Partick Thistle youth ranks before transferring to Greenock Morton and then Livingston.

Senior career
In 2019, Clark signed his first professional contract with Queen's Park and went on to make 11 appearances for The Spiders.  He struggled to hold down a regular starting position for the club and had a loan spell at Annan Athletic in the 2019-2020 season, before making the move permanent that summer.

The defender was then signed for Stirling Albion by manager Darren Young.He scored on his league debut for the Binos in a 4-1 away victory against Forfar on 24 September 2022.

International career
Clark played for Scotland U18 in a 0-0 draw against Northern Ireland U18 in March 2018.

References

External links
Cameron Clark on Soccerbase

2000 births
Living people
Scottish footballers
Scottish Football League players
Association football defenders
Partick Thistle F.C. players
Greenock Morton F.C. players
Livingston F.C. players
Queen's Park F.C. players
Annan Athletic F.C. players
Stirling Albion F.C. players